Salinimonas chungwhensis is a Gram-negative, chemoheterotrophic, moderately halophilic and motile bacterium from the genus of Salinimonas which has been isolated from soil from a solar saltern from Chungwha in Korea.

References

Bacteria described in 2005
Alteromonadales